Richard Basil Prentis (born 27 February 1947) is a former South African rugby union player.

Playing career

Prentis played for Transvaal during his provincial career, which began in 1974. He made his international debut for the Springboks against the visiting South American Jaguars team on 26 April 1980.

During the 1980 Springbok tour to South America, Prentis played in four tour matched and also captained the side against a Paraguay Invitation XV in Asunción. He played in 11 test matches for the Springboks.

Test history

See also
List of South Africa national rugby union players – Springbok no. 504

References

1947 births
Living people
South African rugby union players
South Africa international rugby union players
Rugby union props
People from Krugersdorp
Rugby union players from Gauteng
Golden Lions players